Events in the year 1943 in Turkey.

Parliament
 6th Parliament of Turkey (up to 8 March)
 7th Parliament of Turkey

Incumbents
President – İsmet İnönü 
Prime Minister – Şükrü Saracoğlu

Ruling party and the main opposition
  Ruling party – Republican People's Party (CHP)

Cabinet
13th government of Turkey (up to 9 Merch)
14th government of Turkey (from 9 March)

Events
30 January – Yenice Conference, a meeting between İsmet İnönü and Winston Churchill in which the British side tried to persuade Turkey to join war.
23 February - The architect of the Genocide Talat Pasha's remnants were transported from Germany to Turkey and buried in Abide-i Hurriyet Cemetery (Monument of Liberty), Istanbul.
28 February – General Elections
21 March – Exchange of wounded British and Italian soldiers in Mersin
20 June – 1943 Adapazarı–Hendek earthquake
10 September – Fire in the Grand Bazaar (Kapalıçarşı) 202 shops were destroyed
26 November – 1943 Tosya–Ladik earthquake
4 December – İsmet İnönü met with Winston Churchill and Dwight D. Eisenhower in Cairo

Births
1 January – İbrahim Fırtına, air force general
2 January – Janet Akyüz Mattei, astronomer
2 January – Filiz Akın, actress
2 January – Barış Manço, singer
5 January – Atilla Özdemiroğlu, musician
2 February – Özden Örnek, admiral
3 February – Asaf Savaş Akat, economist
9 February – Cemal Kamacı, boxer
13 February – Şevket Altuğ, actor 
18 April – Zeki Alasya, actor
20 April-  Abdullah Kiğılı, businessman
29 April – İlker Başbuğ, chief of staff
13 May – Sumru Çörtoğlu, lawyer
19 September – Murat Karayalçın, politician
12 December – Fatma Girik, actress

Deaths
13 February – Neyyire Neyir, actress
7 May – Fethi Okyar, former prime minister (3rd government of Turkey)
4 July – Cevat Abbas Gürer – politician

Gallery

References

 
Years of the 20th century in Turkey
Turkey
Turkey
Turkey